Jean-Marie Boisvert (born 20 September 1939) is a Canadian former politician and teacher. He was elected to the House of Commons of Canada in the 1972 election as a Member of the Social Credit Party to represent the riding of Drummond.  During his political career, he sat on various parliamentary committees including the Canadian House of Commons Standing Committee on Justice and Legal Affairs, Canadian House of Commons Special Committee on Trends in Food Prices, Canadian House of Commons Standing Committee on Justice and Legal Affairs and the Standing Joint Committee on the Library of Parliament.

References

 

Members of the House of Commons of Canada from Quebec
Social Credit Party of Canada MPs
French Quebecers
People from Drummondville
Living people
1939 births